Ifeadikachukwu Anthony Odenigbo (born April 8, 1994) is an American football outside linebacker who is a free agent. He played college football at Northwestern and was drafted by the Vikings in the seventh round, 220th overall of the 2017 NFL Draft.

Early years
Born in Bayonne, New Jersey to Nigerian parents Linda and Thomas Odenigbo, Ifeadi was the first member of his family born in the United States. He attended Centerville High School, where he played football firstly on offense and later as a linebacker and defensive end. He recorded 90 tackles and 10.5 sacks as a junior and 50 tackles and 8.5 sacks as a senior in 2011, helping lead Centerville to a 7-4 record and a Greater Western Ohio Conference championship, earning all-region, all-state and all-area player of the year honors. He was selected by USA Football to the 2012 U.S. Under-19 National Team and also competed in the Under Armour All-American Game and International Bowl.

Odenigbo also lettered in track and field all for four years for the Elks. In 2009, he set the freshman record in the 200-meter dash with a time of 22.91 seconds and also recorded the third-fastest time in the 400-meter dash (51.57s). He was all-district in the 110-meter and 300-meter hurdles as a junior with times of 15.14 and 39.93 seconds, respectively. As a senior, he posted a personal-best time of 11.28 seconds in the 100-meter dash at the regional championships and also anchored his team to a third-place finish in the 4x200m relay (1:27.92) at the state championships.

College career
Odenigbo played college football at Northwestern from 2012 to 2016. As a true freshman, he only appeared in a game against Vanderbilt before suffering a season-ending injury, but was granted hardship waiver and did not lose a year of eligibility. The next season, he saw time on the field as a third-down pass-rushing specialist and finished second on the team with 5.5 sacks. As a sophomore, Odenigbo played in all 12 games, primarily on 3rd downs. He tied a Big Ten record and became the first conference player since Bob Sanders to notch 3 forced fumbles in a game, doing so against Western Illinois in week 4. As a junior in 2015, he helped Northwestern to a 10-3 mark, notching 5 sacks on the season, including 1.5 against Stanford.

In his final collegiate season, Odenigbo was designated first-team All-Big Ten by the coaches and second-team by the media after leading the Big Ten Conference with 10 sacks on the year. In week 5, Odenigbo tallied 4 of the Wildcats’ 6 total sacks against Iowa, tying the school record in the 38-31 victory.

Odenigbo ended his collegiate career ranked second in Northwestern school history with 23.5 sacks.

Professional career

Minnesota Vikings
Odenigbo was drafted by the Minnesota Vikings in the seventh round, 220th overall, in the 2017 NFL Draft. He was waived on September 2, 2017 and was signed to the practice squad the next day. He signed a reserve/future contract with the Vikings on January 22, 2018.

On September 1, 2018, Odenigbo was waived by the Vikings.

Cleveland Browns
Odenigbo was claimed off waivers by the Cleveland Browns on September 2, 2018. On September 22, 2018, Odenigbo was waived by the Browns.

Arizona Cardinals
On September 24, 2018, Odenigbo was claimed off waivers by the Arizona Cardinals. He played in one game for the Cardinals before being waived on October 23, 2018.

Minnesota Vikings (second stint)
On October 31, 2018, Odenigbo was signed to the Minnesota Vikings practice squad. He signed a reserve/future contract with the Vikings on January 2, 2019.

On August 31, 2019, the Vikings announced that Odenigbo had earned a spot on the 53-man roster. In week 5, he got his first career sack, tackling Daniel Jones in a road win against the New York Giants. In week 15 against the Los Angeles Chargers, Odenigbo sacked Philip Rivers once and recovered a fumble lost by Rivers which he returned for a 56 yard touchdown during the 39–10 win. In week 17 against the Chicago Bears, Odenigbo recorded a strip sack on Mitchell Trubisky and recovered the football during the 21–19 loss.

Odenigbo was placed on the reserve/COVID-19 list by the Vikings on July 29, 2020, and activated from the list five days later.
He left the Vikings on March 16, 2021

New York Giants
On March 19, 2021, Odenigbo signed a one-year, $2.5 million contract with the New York Giants. He was released on August 31, 2021.

Cleveland Browns (second stint)
Odenigbo was signed to the Cleveland Browns' practice squad on September 6, 2021. He was promoted to the active roster on September 21. In Week 14 Odenigbo recovered a fumble forced by Takkarist McKinley in a 24-22 win over the division rival Baltimore Ravens.

Indianapolis Colts
On June 12, 2022, Odenigbo signed with the Indianapolis Colts. He was released on December 20.

Tampa Bay Buccaneers
On December 27, 2022, Odenigbo was signed to the Tampa Bay Buccaneers practice squad.

Personal life
Odenigbo is of Nigerian descent. His brother Tito Odenigbo also spent the 2019 training camp with the Vikings.

References

External links
Northwestern Wildcats bio
New York Giants bio

1994 births
Living people
21st-century African-American sportspeople
African-American players of American football
American sportspeople of Nigerian descent
People from Centerville, Ohio
Players of American football from Ohio
American football defensive ends
Northwestern Wildcats football players
Minnesota Vikings players
Cleveland Browns players
Arizona Cardinals players
New York Giants players
Indianapolis Colts players
Tampa Bay Buccaneers players